The Chalet of the Golden Fleece is located in New Glarus, Wisconsin.

History
The building was constructed for Edwin P. Barlow. Barlow had founded the annual festival commemorating Wilhelm Tell in New Glarus. The building serves as a museum of Swiss culture. It was added to the State and the National Register of Historic Places in 2015.

References

Commercial buildings on the National Register of Historic Places in Wisconsin
National Register of Historic Places in Green County, Wisconsin
Ethnic museums in Wisconsin
Tourist attractions in Green County, Wisconsin
Vernacular architecture in Wisconsin
Swiss chalet architecture
Commercial buildings completed in 1938